Harvey Jacobson (born 28 June 1956 in the City of Salford) is a businessman and entrepreneur based in the North West of England. He is the executive chairman of the Jacobson Group, an independent supplier of footwear in the UK. Jacobson Group owns more than 75 shoe and clothing brands including Gola, Lotus, Ravel, Dunlop, Lonsdale and Frank Wright. In addition to the Jacobson Group, Jacobson also holds a range of personal business interests, from property development to international trade distribution.

Starting out in business

On his first visit to his father David's shoe shop as a six-year-old, Jacobson sold six pairs of shoes, earning a commission of 6 pennies. At the age of 12, Jacobson began working as a Saturday boy at the same shop. Jacobson left school at 15 to work full-time for his father. By 1978, he had taken ownership of two stalls in Stafford and Manchester indoor markets and, not long after, the remaining units of the family business as his father moved into retirement. In 1979 he set up in business with brother Melvyn, taking over a small wholesaler in North Manchester and trading under the name D Jacobson & Sons. Soon after, the pair opened their first trade Cash and carry outlet in Rawtenstall, Lancashire, where the Jacobson Group headquarters remain today. During this period the business focused on distribution with Jacobson responsible for sales and marketing. During the 1980s and early 1990s, the business experienced significant growth as the company expanded from wholesale to import distribution. It was during this period that the company began to operate internationally. By the mid-1990s, the company's turnover was in excess of £15 million.

Entry into brands
In 1996, Jacobson acquired Gola and the rights to Dunlop slippers. These were followed in subsequent years by brands including Lotus, Ravel, Frank Wright, Manfield and Trueform. The group also acquired a number of licences, including the Lonsdale brand.
At the same time as the company's entry into branded footwear, the group also expanded its presence in the own-label contract supply market, securing business with a range of high-street retailers.

Current work
Today, the Jacobson Group has interests in different footwear and clothing businesses. The group annually supplies merchandise with a value in excess of £250 million and employs over 300 people across the UK at its premises in Rawtenstall, Oldham, Northampton & London.
In addition to his role with the Jacobson Group, Jacobson was an investor in North Shoe Ltd. during the 1990s. North Show grew from one retail outlet to 29 in five years. During the period of Jacobson's involvement, the company grew by approximately 2000%. Between 2002 and 2004 he was Chairman of the Original Factory Shop Ltd. Today Jacobson owns a number of individual properties in the UK, South America and Europe and has an interest in five property development schemes in the North West of England. In addition, he holds shareholdings in two trade distribution companies and two retail businesses.  In 2007, Jacobson was named in the Sunday Times Rich List for the first time.

References

External links 
 Jacobson boss takes back seat

1956 births
Living people
People from Salford
English businesspeople